Glaphyria polycyma is a moth in the family Crambidae. It is found in Brazil and Argentina.

References

Moths described in 1898
Glaphyriini